Swartzia rediviva is a species of flowering plant in the family Fabaceae.
It is found only in Suriname.

Description 
It was first described by Richard Sumner Cowan in 1973. The first description is based on a specimen collected near the banks of the left Coppename River. Publication of this description was accelerated ahead of a set of the publication other taxa descriptions, to facilitate its inclusion into the imminent release of the book Flora of Suriname.

Range 
This species is said to be only found in Suriname. GBIF, which is an aggregation service of observational data on species, has no observations so far.

References

rediviva
Flora of Suriname
Vulnerable plants
Taxonomy articles created by Polbot